Signature Sounds Recordings is an independent record label specializing in Americana and modern folk music. Jim Olsen and Mark Thayer founded the label in 1995 to promote acoustic musicians who were playing in Northampton, Massachusetts.

Signature recorded Josh Ritter, Erin McKeown, Mary Gauthier, and Lori McKenna. The label's albums are distributed worldwide by Redeye Distribution.

History
Thayer established the Signature Sounds Recording Studio in 1982 and created the label with Olsen in 1995. The studio in Pomfret, Connecticut has recorded folk and jazz musicians, including many Signature Sounds recordings. The label's main office moved in 2012 from its original location in Whately, Massachusetts to a more prominent site in downtown Northampton. The new offices include an intimate music venue, called The Parlor Room, in which concerts are held regularly.

Roster

See also 
List of record labels

References

External links

Folk record labels
American independent record labels
Record labels established in 1995
Pomfret, Connecticut
Northampton, Massachusetts